Shuangyashan is a coal mining prefecture-level city located in the eastern part Heilongjiang province, People's Republic of China, bordering Russia's Khabarovsk and Primorsky Krais to the east. The city's name means a pair-of-ducks mountains and refers to two peaks northeast of the city. In 2007 the city had a GDP of RMB 20.6 billion with a 14.2% growth rate.

Administrative divisions

History
Shuangyashan was given its name in AD 1384 during the Ming Dynasty. However, few people lived in the area before coal was discovered there in 1914. In 1928 a major coal mining operation was established on the site and in 1946 the area was first designated a county. Shuangyashan was established as a special mining district in 1954 and officially designated a city by the CPC Central Committee and State Council in 1956.

Geography and climate

Resources
Shuangyashan is rich in coal, magnetite and marble. The proven coal reserves in the city total 11 billion tons, ranking first out of 13 prefecture and prefecture-level cities in the province. The magnetite reserves in Shuangyashan exceed 120 million tons, ranking first in Heilongjiang Province.

Climate
The city has a cold temperate monsoon climate, with long, cold, windy winters.

Economy
Shuangyashan is a major center for coal mining. The city also produces steel, lumber, chemicals, building materials, textiles, electric machinery, and food products. In 2010, Shuangyashan's GDP reached RMB 37.67 billion, featuring a growth of 25% from a year ago.  The production output of steel and coal ranked the first and the second in Heilongjiang province. The region has attracted investments from large domestic companies such as Shandong Luneng Group and Jianlong Group. Tourism, retailing and wholesaling are also the pillars of the city's service sector.

More recently, the city has been feeling the effects of the coal downturn, with mining demand collapsing amidst a slowdown in China's economic growth.

Transportation
A new high-speed railway station in Shuangyashan City is the Jiamusi Mudanjiang high-speed railway line, which can reach Harbin, Dalian, Shijiazhuang and other cities. The average time to Harbin is 3 hours and the average time to Jiamusi is 25 minutes.Shuangyashan is the end of the Harbin to Shuangyashan railway spur link. 15 hours from Harbin by train, and 90 minutes from the closest prefecture-level city, Jiamusi. There is a modern coach service as well which does this trip in approximately 45 minutes.

Sight-seeing

Shuangyashan is surrounded by small mountains, and a large park based around one of these mountains forms a major feature of the outdoor life of the town. During the winter, this pine and elm-covered mountain forms an area for recreational activities.

References

External links
 Shuangyashan official homepage

 
Cities in Heilongjiang
Prefecture-level divisions of Heilongjiang